Christine Evans (born 1943) is a poet of Welsh origin, born in the West Riding of Yorkshire and writing in English. She lives in North Wales. Her book Cometary Phrases was Welsh Book of the Year in 1989.

Career
In 1967 Evans moved to Pwllheli on the Llŷn Peninsula in 1967 to teach English at Pwllheli County Grammar School, which is now part of Ysgol Glan y Môr. Her father and grandmother had been brought up there.

Evans then married into a Bardsey Island farming family. She currently lives half the year on Bardsey Island, spending winters and doing her writing there at Uwchmynydd.

While on maternity leave in 1976, Christine Evans started writing poems in English. Her first book, Looking Inland, appeared seven years later. Cometary Phases was declared Welsh Book of the Year in 1989. Her Selected Poems won her the inaugural Roland Mathias Prize in 2005, from the Brecknock Society and Museum Friends, for its "fresh eye and boldness of metaphor, a sense of living on the threshold of other worlds."

She has also written fiction and non-fiction for children and young adults.

Bibliography
Looking Inland (Seren, 1983)
Falling Back (Seren, 1986)
Cometary Phases (Seren, 1989)
Island of Dark Horses (Seren, 1995)
Selected Poems (Seren, 2004)
Growth Rings (Seren, 2006)
Burning the Candle (Gomer, 2006)

References

Further reading
Pippa Marland, Island of the Dead. Composting Twenty-Thousand Saints on Bardsey Island, in: Green Letters. Studies in Ecocriticism, 18, 1 (2014; Special Issue: Junk/Composting), pp. 78–90. (Compares Tide Race (1962) by Brenda Chamberlain (1912–1971) with Evans' Island of Dark Horses of 1995)
Matthew Jarvis, Christine Evans's Bardsey. Creating Sacred Space, in: Welsh Writing in English. A Yearbook of Critical Essays, 11 (2006–2007), pp. 188–209. About Island of Dark Horses (1995)

1943 births
Living people
20th-century Welsh poets
21st-century Welsh poets
20th-century Welsh women writers
21st-century Welsh women writers
21st-century Welsh writers
People from the West Riding of Yorkshire (before 1974)
Anglo-Welsh women poets
Writers from Yorkshire